Elyes Cherif Gabel (born 8 May 1983) is an English actor. He gained recognition for his portrayal of Dr Gurpreet "Guppy" Sandhu in the BBC medical drama Casualty (2004–2007), computer genius Walter O'Brien in the CBS series Scorpion (2014–2018), Dothraki Rakharo in Seasons 1 and 2 of the HBO series Game of Thrones (2011–2012), and PE teacher Rob Cleaver in the BBC One school-based drama series Waterloo Road (2009). Gabel was last seen as Sean Tilson in Apple TV+ suspense-thriller, Suspicion (2022).

His other notable appearances are as DC Jose Rodriguez in the ITV drama Identity (2010), Detective Adam Lucas in season 3 of Body of Proof (2013), as virologist Andrew Fassbach in post-apocalyptic thriller film World War Z (2013), as Julian in crime drama film A Most Violent Year (2014), and as Adem Qasim in spy thriller film Spooks: The Greater Good (2015).

Early life
Gabel was born in Westminster, London and lived in Canada, before returning to the UK to live in Bristol and Manchester. He is of Algerian, French, Spanish, Dutch, Anglo-Indian, Irish and Portuguese descent. He attended St Damian's Roman Catholic Science College in Ashton-Under-Lyne. He later trained at Strodes College, the Oldham Theatre Workshop and the Northern Kids Theatre Company. He has also trained at Webber Douglas Academy of Dramatic Art, London. At the age of 18, he left school to shoot for a TV show in Toronto.

Career

2001–2007: Early work and recognition through Casualty
Gabel made his debut in 2001 as the character Jean-Claude Tournier in episode titled Breaking point of Series 15 of BBC medical drama Casualty. In 2002, Gabel dropped out of drama school to appear on the children's fantasy sitcom I Love Mummy where he portrayed Pharaoh Prince Nuffratuti (Prince Nuff) of Abu Simbel, who is unable to ascend to the afterlife until he has completed his scroll of tasks. In 2004, he appeared as Steve in BBC One medical soap opera Doctors. In the same year, Gabel appeared as two different characters in different episodes of Casualty. Later he joined as series regular character Gurpreet Guppy Sandhu in the same show as a part of Series 19. He was nominated as Most Popular Newcomer at the 2005 National Television Awards for the role. He also appeared as Gurpreet in episode four titled "Teacher's Pet" of Casualty@Holby City, a nine part special crossover series of Casualty and its spin off Holby City in 2005. He decided to leave Casualty in 2007 to pursue new acting challenges and concentrate on recording music with his band.

2008–2013: Film debut, Game of Thrones, Body of Proof and World War Z
In 2008, he made his debut in films portraying the character Ben in American supernatural horror film Boogeyman 3, the final installment of Boogeyman film series. In the same year, Gabel appeared as Vimal, a trainee priest, in the BBC drama Apparitions, alongside Martin Shaw. The first episode aired on BBC One on 13 November 2008. He then starred as P.E. teacher Rob Cleaver in the BBC One school drama Waterloo Road from series 4, which began on 7 January 2009. 
In 2010, Gabel starred in the 6-part British police procedural series Identity as DC Jose Rodriguez on ITV, a member of the identity unit. In the same year, he lent his voice to Apache: Air Assault, a combat flight simulator video game. In 2011, He played Prince Djem, brother of Sultan Bayezid II of the Ottoman Empire in Showtime's The Borgias. In the same year, he played Shahrouz in the second series of British psychological horror-thriller black comedy mystery television series Psychoville and as Ahmed in war torn Baghdad based hostage drama film Kingdom of Dust: Beheading of Adam Smith.

He later appeared as the Dothraki "Bloodrider" Rakharo, loyal bodyguard of Daenerys Targaryen in the season-1 and beginning of season-2 of HBO fantasy series Game of Thrones. According to the showrunners David Benioff and D. B. Weiss, journey of his character in the show had to be cut short as he quit the show to pursue projects that put him more front and center. In 2011, he joined the cast of CIA procedural Fox pilot Exit Strategy, portraying transport expert Tarik Fayad alongside Ethan Hawke but the show was dropped after being considered for a midseason airing and later released as a television film. In the same year, he appeared as Jaz in British coming of age drama film Everywhere and Nowhere alongside James Floyd and Adam Deacon. In 2012, he appeared as Troy Vargas in David Hubbard's CBS film Widow Detective. In the same year, he appeared as Umar in the Silent Witness two-part episode "And Then I Fell in Love".

In 2013, Gabel starred as Detective Adam Lucas in Season 3 of American medical/crime comedy drama television series, Body of Proof on ABC. His character Adam Lucas was described as young, smart, a rebel and a Philadelphia native, who is a new entrant in Philadelphia Homicide division, in the revamped third season of the show. The show was ABC's third most-watched show and yet was cancelled by the channel at the end of the season 3.  He later appeared as Ruan Sternwood in Eran Creevy's action thriller film Welcome to the Punch alongside James McAvoy, Mark Strong, and Andrea Riseborough. He went on to appear as Danny in Charlie Brooker's horror comedy drama miniseries based on zombie outbreak titled Dead Set. Later in the same year, he appeared as a young virologist Andrew Fassbach in World War Z, based on the 2006 novel of the same name by Max Brooks.

2014–2018: Break out performance in Scorpion 
Gabel starred as an eccentric computing genius Walter O'Brien on the American drama series Scorpion by Nick Santora on CBS, based on the real life of Walter O'Brien. According to the show creator Nick Santora, "Gabel was able to play the difficulty of expressing emotion while being emotional" for the character of Walter O'Brien, who had difficulty processing and expressing emotions. The series debuted on 22 September 2014 and became the highest rated and highest streamed drama for CBS. Scorpion also won The Golden Nymph award for 'Best Action & Science Fiction TV Series' in Monte-Carlo Television Festival (2018). The series was cancelled after 4 seasons, 93 episodes despite having higher ratings than other cancellations with the last airing on 16 April 2018. Gabel starred in all 93 episodes of the series and was termed as one of the "11 Breakout Stars of the Fall TV Season 2014" by TheWrap and TVLine. In the same year, he made an appearance in a crossover episode of Scorpion with American action television series NCIS: Los Angeles, had a cameo appearance in Christopher Nolan's  science fiction film Interstellar. He was also seen as Julian in J. C. Chandor's American crime drama film A Most Violent Year, which was among "323 feature films eligible for the 87th Academy Awards" as announced by the Academy of Motion Picture Arts and Sciences. In 2015, he appeared as Adem Qasim in British spy thriller film Spooks: The Greater Good alongside Kit Harington and Jennifer Ehle. In 2017, he directed an episode titled "Black White & a shade of grey" of TV series Stakes. In 2018, he directed and produced a short feature film titled Grimshaw based on drug addiction and regression of individual freedom for which he received the Jury Award for Best Director in Show Low Film Festival (2018).

2019–present

In 2019, he gave voice to Thomas Kallor also known as Star Boy/Star Man, a member of Legion of Super-Heroes and an ally to Justice League in DC Entertainment's direct-to-video animated superhero film Justice League vs. the Fatal Five. The film had its world premiere at WonderCon ’19 (March 29–31, 2019). He has written, directed and produced a short film titled Game Show Hurt alongside fellow Scorpion alumni Kevin Weisman, Glenn Keogh and Paul K. Daniel.
In 2020, he joined the cast of the thriller Suspicion on Apple TV+ based on the Israeli thriller TV series False Flag, alongside Uma Thurman and Kunal Nayyar. Gabel portrayed British citizen Sean Tilson in eight part thriller series which premiered on 4 February 2022 on Apple TV+.

Personal life
Gabel dated Scorpion co-star Katharine McPhee for almost two years. They split in 2016.

Philanthropy
In 2005, Gabel performed in Children in Need, an annual BBC charity telethon for disadvantaged children and young people in the UK. In 2008, he joined actors and sports stars to record a rap-single to support the Anti-knife campaign and raising money to fight the spate of knife crimes. He supports ALS Association Golden West Chapter to help in the fight to end ALS and raising awareness and funds for the disease in honor of his maternal grandmother Noreen Gurney who suffered from the disease via his fundraising page Teamelyes.org. In 2014, he was part of ALS Association Golden West Chapter's "walk to defeat ALS" alongside Renée Zellweger, Reese Witherspoon. In the same year, Gabel along with the cast of Scorpion was part of CBS Cares's awareness and discussion campaigns for Autism. He was associated with American Forces Network / AFN's Stop Bullying Body Positive campaign along with the Scorpion cast in 2015. In the same year, Gabel along with his Scorpion co-star Katharine Mcphee joined Sloane Stephens, CoCo Vandeweghe, Justin Gimelstob, Boris Kodjoe and others for a Pro-Am tennis tournament in Brentwood to help raise money for the United States Tennis Association Foundation, which supports tennis and educational programs under- resourced youth, individuals with disabilities, and wounded, ill and injured service members, veterans and their families. Gabel was also involved in CBS Cares's awareness, discussions and fundraising campaigns for Multiple sclerosis (MS) during its awareness month, March in association with a nonprofit organization, National Multiple Sclerosis Society in 2017. In 2019, he supported "Raising the Stakes" charity by One Step Closer Foundation for raising funds towards helping people with Cerebral palsy by participating in Cerebral Palsy (CP) Celebrity Poker Tournament.

Filmography

Film

Television

As Writer, producer & director

Theatre

Discography
Gabel is a singer, songwriter and a guitarist who also fronts a band El & The Broken Bones. He considers music as passion and has expressed his love for emotional and haunting scores. His songs are available online on his youtube channel Roughened Verse Elyes.  Gabel along with his Casualty costar, Luke Bailey performed a rendition of The Beatles  classic I Saw Her Standing There in 2005 edition of annual BBC charity telethon for disadvantaged children and young people in the UK, Children in Need. In 2008, Gabel recorded a single along with Luke Bailey, Stephen Nicholas, Lee Otway, Junior Witter and Girls Aloud, under the collaboration UK Flow, a campaign aimed at raising money to fight the spate of knife crimes. In 2016, he did a Karaoke rendition of Elton John’s Don't Go Breaking My Heart alongside his costar Katharine McPhee in Season-2, episode 14 "Sun of a Gun" and a musical in Season-4, episode 1 "Extinction" (2017) for his show Scorpion.

On February 28,  2023, Elyes launched new music with a live event on his Instagram. It is called LACUNA which means "an unfilled space" he wrote it at the end of 2022, LACUNA started off as a little fingerpicking guitar riff in Joshua tree. LACUNA allowed him to fill up once more with music. Featuring Koi Anunta on violin & Glenn Holdaway on trumpet. Collaborators Kabir Affonso - Videographer & Will Nealy - Mixer. It is published now on his YouTube channel  

Some of his music compositions are:

 Beauty's Bad (live)
 Bow Down to Time
 Could It Be My Fault (live at Battersea)
 Dirty Grey Grout
 Ever I feel
 Find a spot
 Hello Winter
 High Hopes
 Hold On
 Hometown Glory
 If You Knew You Hurt Your Baby (bit)
 Lacuna (new release of Feb 28th, 2023)
 Pastures New
 Pay Attention Lord
 Shame on You
 Wade Through Water
 Wasting Time (rough mix)
 Well I

Awards and nominations

References

External links

1983 births
Living people
20th-century English male actors
21st-century English male actors
English male film actors
English male stage actors
English male television actors
English people of Algerian descent
English people of Dutch descent
English people of Indian descent
English people of Irish descent
English people of Portuguese descent
English people of Spanish descent
Male actors from London